Afrikaans is a daughter language of Dutch mainly spoken in South Africa and Namibia; it is a separate standard language rather than a national variety, unlike Netherlands Dutch, Belgian Dutch and Surinamese Dutch. An estimated 90 to 95% of Afrikaans vocabulary is ultimately of Dutch origin, so there are few lexical differences between the two languages, however Afrikaans has a considerably more regular morphology, grammar, and spelling.

Mutual intelligibility
There is a high degree of mutual intelligibility between the two languages, particularly in written form. Research suggests that mutual intelligibility between Dutch and Afrikaans is better than between Dutch and Frisian or between Danish and Swedish. Mutual intelligibility tends to be asymmetrical, as it is easier for Dutch speakers to understand Afrikaans than for Afrikaans speakers to understand Dutch.

Intelligibility of Afrikaans to Dutch speakers

Cognate words
Although Afrikaans borrows some lexical and syntactical structures from other languages, including Malay, Portuguese, Khoisan languages, Bantu languages, and to a lesser extent Low German, Dutch speakers are confronted with fewer non-cognates when listening to Afrikaans than the other way around.

In Afrikaans, het is the inflection of the verb hê ("to have" from Dutch hebben) although sy (cognate with zijn) is used as the subjunctive of "to be", while we in Dutch is cognate with "we" in English, a language widely understood by Afrikaans speakers. Conversely, wees, meaning "to be" in Afrikaans, is used as the imperative in Dutch, although it is used as the imperative in religious contexts in Afrikaans (e.g. wees genadig, meaning "be merciful" or "have mercy").

Verb forms
The simplification of verbs in Afrikaans, with almost all verbs being regular and the near absence of the simple past tense, means that while the phrase ek het gehelp ("I have helped" or "I helped") would be recognisable by Dutch speakers, the Dutch phrases ik heb geholpen and ik hielp would not be as readily understood by speakers of Afrikaans.

Similarly, the resemblance of Afrikaans verbs like lees ("to read", Dutch lezen) to the first person singular and verbs like gaan ("to go") to infinitive forms in Dutch means that julle lees ("you [plural] read") or ek gaan ("I go") would be understood by Dutch speakers more readily than jullie lezen or ik ga would be by Afrikaans speakers.

Unmarked and marked forms of words
As Afrikaans no longer has unmarked and marked forms of words, instead using words derived from the marked forms in Dutch, the Afrikaans words for "there" and "now", daar and nou, are more intelligible to speakers of Dutch than the unmarked Dutch forms er and nu  are to Afrikaans speakers.

For example, nou is daar, meaning "now there is" in Afrikaans, is sometimes encountered in Dutch although nou is used more colloquially for emphasis, in the sense of the English "well". In Dutch, "now there is" would be translated as nu is er, using the unmarked forms, which do not exist in Afrikaans.

Intelligibility of Dutch to Afrikaans speakers

Loanwords vs purisms
Afrikaans uses purisms or calques where Dutch would use loans from French, Latin or English. Owing to the exposure of Afrikaans speakers to English, Dutch words like computer, lift and appartement are more readily understood by them than Afrikaans equivalents like rekenaar, hysbak and woonstel are by Dutch speakers.

Similarly, Dutch words such as favoriet ("favourite"), film, and station are intelligible to Afrikaans speakers on account of their resemblance to their English equivalents, whereas the Afrikaans gunsteling, rolprent, and stasie (cognate with Dutch statie), while intelligible to Dutch speakers, would be considered old-fashioned.

Words of Dutch and non-Dutch origin
In addition, while Afrikaans may use words of non-Dutch origin unintelligible to Dutch speakers (such as those derived from Malay, like baie), their Dutch equivalents, or cognates, are also used in Afrikaans, and would therefore be more intelligible to Dutch speakers.

For example, although Afrikaans baie ("very", "many" or "much"), from banyak has no cognate in Dutch, heel as in heel goed ("very good") is used in Afrikaans as well as Dutch. The Afrikaans word amper ("almost" or "nearly) is unrelated to the Dutch word amper ("scarcely" or "sour"), being derived from the Malay hampir, but the Dutch word bijna, also meaning "almost" or "nearly", is cognate with byna in Afrikaans.

Orthographic differences 
Orthographic differences between Dutch and Afrikaans are mainly due to phonetic evolutions and spelling simplifications in Afrikaans, and the more conservative character of and recent changes to modern Dutch orthography.

However, some aspects of Afrikaans orthography also resemble those of older forms of Dutch, for example, whereas "God be with you" in modern Dutch would be God zij met u, the Afrikaans spelling God sy met u, was also used in 18th century Dutch. The current Dutch spelling, using  and the digraph , became prevalent from the 19th century.

Afrikaans simplifications

Afrikaans uses  for the Dutch hard , both pronounced [ k ]; compare Dutch  ("culture") with Afrikaans .

Words in Dutch with the letter combination , when pronounced as [ kk ] are transliterated in Afrikaans using , for example, acclimatiseren and accommodatie in Dutch become Afrikaans akklimatiseer and akkommodasie ("akkommodasie" is used for all meanings of "accommodation" except "a place to stay"; for that meaning, the most accepted word is "verblyf", cognate with Dutch "").
  

However, although the Dutch words China and Chinees (inflected as Chinese) are transliterated in Afrikaans using  as Sjina, Sjinees, and Sjinese respectively, the Dutch spellings are also used, particularly in the media. In some Afrikaans dictionaries, China is standard, while Sjinees is listed as an alternative spelling to Chinees.

Transliteration of loanwords

This also applies to word endings; compare Dutch Jiddisch ("Yiddish") with Afrikaans Jiddisj, although the latter is also encountered in Dutch.

Both languages also use  (also pronounced as [ tʃ ]) in some geographical names, despite other differences in spelling; compare Dutch Tsjaad ("Chad") with Afrikaans Tsjad.

Use of  instead of soft 
Another difference between the two languages concerns verbs derived from Latin or French, with Dutch using a soft  and Afrikaans using , hence communiceren and provoceren ("to communicate" and "to provoke") in Dutch become kommunikeer and provokeer in Afrikaans, although kommuniseren was also used in 18th century Dutch.

The word kommuniseer was also previously used in Afrikaans to mean  or "to make communist". Similarly, the verb kompliseer, similar to Dutch compliceren, is used to mean "to complicate", both using the  sound.

By contrast, related nouns in both languages contain the  sound, hence communicatie and provocatie in Dutch and kommunikasie and provokasie in Afrikaans.

Changes to digraph  
In both languages, this suffix is pronounced , with a schwa.

Afrikaans similarly uses Ysland, which was also used in 18th century Dutch.

However, few place names in South Africa of Dutch origin begin with Y, with the exception of Yzerfontein in the Western Cape. The spelling of name of the town, which means iron fountain, is based on the old Dutch word for iron, yzer. It was also previously written as Ijsterfontein. The modern Afrikaans word for iron is yster, while in Dutch it is ijzer.	 
  

Mergers of digraphs or trigraphs 

outonomie. 

The Dutch cluster  became  in Afrikaans.

Dropping of final letters 
Also in Dutch, final -n is often deleted after a schwa, but the occurrence and frequency of this phenomenon varies between speakers, and it is not recognised in spelling.

Phonetically induced spelling differences

Simplification of consonant clusters
Afrikaans has frequently simplified consonant clusters in final position that are still present in Dutch, although they are used in inflected forms of adjectives, for example, bes ("best") in Afrikaans is still inflected as beste, as in Dutch, hence beste man ooit (best man ever) is correct in both languages.

Similarly,  dienst (service, pronounced ) was reduced to diens in Afrikaans.

Similarly, whereas Dutch words like technologie ("technology") and monarchie ("monarchy") contain  (in this case pronounced as ) their Afrikaans equivalents use , hence tegnologie and monargie.

Consonant mergers

However, although Suid-Afrika ("South Africa") is used in Afrikaans rather than Zuid-Afrika as in Dutch, South Africa adopted "ZA" as its international vehicle registration code in 1936, which later became the country's ISO country code, with .za becoming the country's internet domain.

Compare Dutch haven (port) with Afrikaans hawe, both pronounced .

Consonant omissions

In Afrikaans, as in Dutch, oor also means "ear".

Where  precedes final  in Dutch, as in boven ("above") pronounced  and geloven ("believe") pronounced , in Afrikaans they merge to form the diphthong , resulting in bo and glo. Similarly, open and samen ("together") in Dutch become oop, and saam in Afrikaans.

At the end of words, Dutch  is sometimes omitted in Afrikaans, which opens up the preceding vowel (usually a short ) now written with a circumflex. For example, the Dutch verb form zeg ("say", pronounced ) became sê in Afrikaans, as did the infinitive zeggen, pronounced . Another example is the Dutch leggen ("to lay", pronounced ), which becomes lê in Afrikaans.

Alternatively, Dutch verb form vraag ("ask", pronounced ) became vra in Afrikaans, which is also the equivalent of the Dutch verb vragen, "to ask". Unlike Dutch, vraag in Afrikaans, pronounced , is only used as a noun meaning "question", with vrae, pronounced , being the plural form.

The word for "day" in both languages is dag, but whereas the plural in Dutch is dagen, in Afrikaans it is dae. By contrast, wagen or "wagon" in Dutch, pronounced , became wa in Afrikaans,, with the plural form, wagens, pronounced , became waëns.

Circumflex

Diminutive
For example, whereas the diminutive of beet ("bit") in Dutch would be beetje  (pronounced [beːt͡ʃə]), in Afrikaans, the diminutive of biet would be bietjie (pronounced [biːki]).

This ending is also found in some varieties of Dutch Low Saxon, a group of dialects spoken in the Northeastern Netherlands.

The  ending is also found in some varieties of Dutch Low Saxon: glassie(n), koppie(n), probleempie(n). In addition, the  diminutive is used in Hollands dialects such as that of Amsterdam as well as in less formal registers of general Dutch. "A cute little face", for instance, can be rendered as Een schattig koppie.

In both languages, the word for "niece" is a diminutive of the word for "female cousin", but owing to the simplification of consonant clusters in Afrikaans, nig becomes niggie, using   in contrast to Dutch, in which nicht becomes nichtje. The adjectives saggies and zachtjes, both meaning "softly", are diminutives of Afrikaans sag and Dutch zacht respectively.

Other spelling differences 

Unlike Dutch, the names of months in Afrikaans are capitalised, hence 2 June 2016 would be written as 2 Junie 2016, whereas in Dutch, it would be written as 2 juni 2016.

Phonetic differences 

Afrikaans pronunciation tends to be closest to the dialects of the province of South Holland, in particular that of Zoetermeer.

Consonant mergers
A similar phonetic evolution can be found in the Northern Netherlands.

The same merger is present though in the areas around Amsterdam, where all voiced consonants merged with the voiceless ones, pronounced as the latter ones.

Fricative mergers

However, in some Dutch varieties, such as Southern West Flemish and certain dialects of Dutch Low Saxon,  can also be heard word-medially as well as syllable-initially.

Vowels

Grammatical differences 
Grammatical differences are arguably the most considerable difference between Afrikaans and Dutch, as a result of the loss of inflections in Afrikaans, as well as the loss of some verb tenses, leading to it being greatly simplified in its grammar compared to Dutch.

Unlike Dutch, Afrikaans has no grammatical gender, and therefore only has one form of the definite article die, while standard Dutch has two (de for both masculine and feminine nouns and het for neuter ones) and Dutch dialects in the Southern Netherlands have a third, den, used for masculine nouns.

The verb "to be" in Afrikaans is wees (from Dutch wezen); the Dutch zijn only survives in Afrikaans in the form of the subjunctive sy, as in God sy met u ("God be with you"). In Dutch, as in Afrikaans, wees is used as an imperative, hence wees sterk! ("be strong!") while wezen is used as a less formal form of to be than zijn.

Verb conjugations 
In Afrikaans verbs, the same form is generally used for both the infinitive and the present tense, with the exception of wees ("to be") conjugated as is and hê ("to have") conjugated as het, and there is no inflection for person; contrast ek gaan ("I go") with ik ga, hy doen ("he does") with hij doet, and julle was ("you (plural) were") with jullie waren.

The past participle is usually regularly formed by adding the prefix ge- to the verb, hence gedoen ("done") is formed from doen in Afrikaans, although Dutch gedaan survives in Afrikaans as welgedaan! ("well done!") One exception is the verb hê ("to have") of which the past participle is gehad, while sometimes an irregular past participle is used with the verb dink ("to think") hence  hy het gedag or hy het gedog, similar to Dutch hij heeft gedacht, instead of hy het gedink.

All other verbs use the existing form as the past participle. For example, "to pay" is betaal and "I have paid" is "ek het betaal", while "to translate" is "vertaal" and "he has translated" is hy het vertaal; Dutch would use betaald (from betalen) and vertaald (from vertalen) respectively.

Verb tenses 

Afrikaans has dropped the simple past tense for all but a few verbs, of which five are modals, hence kon ("could") from kan or "can" and moes or "should" from moet or "must"; instead, it generally uses either the present perfect or the present tense, depending on context, the latter being used as the historical present. It has also lost the pluperfect, conjugated using had, no longer used, with the present perfect, conjugated with het, being used instead.

Consequently, the sentence ek het die boek vir haar gegee in Afrikaans can be translated into Dutch as ik heb het boek aan haar gegeven ("I have given the book to her") ik gaf het boek aan haar ("I gave the book to her") or ik had het boek aan haar gegeven ("I had given the book to her").

However, the verb dink ("to think") still makes use of a simple past tense; for example, instead of ek het gedink to mean "I thought", ek dag or ek dog, similar to Dutch ik dacht, is sometimes used instead.

Whereas Dutch distinguishes between verbs that use zijn ("to be") and verbs that use hebben ("to have") in the present perfect, Afrikaans has dropped this distinction, instead using hê ("to have"), hence "he has been" is hy het al gewees in Afrikaans, while hij is geweest would be used in Dutch. In Dutch Low Saxon, hebben is found in the present perfect as well: .

The past tense of the passive voice in Afrikaans uses is, the present tense of wees instead of word, hence dit word geskryf ("it is written") becomes dit is geskryf ("it was/has been written"). In Dutch, the passive voice can be constructed by both zijn and worden, hence het is/wordt geschreven, and het was/werd geschreven.

Dutch, like English, has a continuous tense using the verb zijn ("to be") with aan het ("on the") and the infinitive, hence "I am reading" is ik ben aan het lezen, which may be expressed periphrastically in Afrikaans as ek is besig om te lees (literally "I am busy of to read") or "I am busy reading". However, a similar grammatical construction may be found in Afrikaans using wees ("to be") and aan die ("on the") as in ek is aan die werk ("I am working"), though this is less common than ek werk ("I work"/"I am working").

Omitting of subordinate conjunctions

In Afrikaans, as in English, it is possible to omit the subordinate conjunction dat ("that"); for example, the phrase "I believe [that] she has done it" can be translated into Afrikaans as either ek glo dat sy dit gedoen het or ek glo sy het dit gedoen (note the change in position of the auxiliary verb het), but in Dutch it is not possible to do so, hence the sentence would be translated as ik geloof dat ze het gedaan heeft.

Merger of marked and unmarked forms of words
Whereas Dutch has unmarked and marked forms for pronouns, adverbs and indicatives, Afrikaans uses only one form; for example, whereas Dutch uses er to mean "here" or "there", Afrikaans only uses hier for "here" and daar for "there", as well as hiervan ("hereof") for "of this/these" and daarvan  ("thereof") for "of that/those/them" , not ervan as in Dutch.

Pronouns in Afrikaans, whether subjects, objects or possessives, usually have only one form, derived from the Dutch marked forms; compare my in Afrikaans, which can be used either as the object "me" or the possessive "my", with Dutch marked forms mij and mijn, the unmarked forms being me for "me" and m'n for "my" respectively. Whereas Dutch uses the term van mij, van jou, van hem, van haar, van ons, van jullie. to mean "mine", "yours", "his", "her", "ours" and "theirs" respectively, Afrikaans uses myne, joune, syne, haar sunne, ons sunne, and hulle sunne.

Dutch uses an apostrophe in some unmarked possessive pronouns instead of the digraph , hence zijn "his" or "its" becomes z'n, whereas in Afrikaans, sy is not abbreviated. In Afrikaans sy also means "she", but Dutch equivalents ze (unmarked) and zij (marked)  mean either "she" as in ze/zij is ("she is"), or "they", as in ze/zij zijn ("they are").

Similarly, Afrikaans uses only jy as the subject "you" (singular) where Dutch uses je or jij, jou as the object "you" where Dutch uses je or jou, and as the possessive "your" where Dutch would use jou or jouw.

Personal pronouns

Afrikaans, unlike Dutch, has no unmarked or marked forms of pronouns; whereas Dutch distinguishes between je/jij and ze/zij for "you" (singular) and "she" as subject pronouns, Afrikaans uses only jy and sy, while whereas me/mij and je/jou are the Dutch unmarked or marked forms of object pronouns for  "me" and "you", Afrikaans only uses my and jou.

It also lacks the distinction between the subject and object form for plural personal pronouns; the first person plural pronoun in Afrikaans differs markedly from Dutch, with ons meaning either "we" or "us", in contrast to Dutch we and wij, hence "we go to the beach" is ons gaan na die strand as opposed to we gaan naar het strand.

Similarly, the third person plural pronoun in Afrikaans is hulle, used to mean "they" or "them", in contrast to Dutch in which ze and zij are used as plural pronouns, hence "they are the best" is hulle is die beste as opposed to ze zijn de beste, although hullie is encountered in Dutch dialects, particularly in North Brabant and North and South Holland.

Other possessive pronouns like ons ("our", inflected as onze in Dutch and onse in Afrikaans) and Dutch jullie ("your" plural, julle in Afrikaans) work in a similar fashion in both languages.

Demonstrative pronouns

The word die is used in Afrikaans as a definite article, but in Dutch, it is used as a demonstrative pronoun meaning "that" or "those", or as a relative pronoun meaning "who", "which" or "that", for which Afrikaans would use wat; compare Afrikaans die man wat weet ("the man who knows") with Dutch de man die weet.

For demonstratives, Afrikaans uses hierdie for "this" or "these" and daardie for "that" or "those", which are shortened to dié (with an acute accent) and daai. In Dutch, dit is used as the word for "this", whereas in Afrikaans it is the third-person singular impersonal pronoun meaning "it", with dis being a contraction of dit is, similar to "it's" in English.

Genitive 

As Afrikaans has no genitive forms of nouns, the official titles of most countries include the word van, although this was considered optional, hence Republiek van Malta (as opposed to Republiek  Malta as in Dutch) although Republiek van Suid-Afrika was previously considered an anglicism. However, the Union of South Africa was known in Dutch and Afrikaans as Unie van Zuid-Afrika and Unie van Suid-Afrika respectively.

The title "Kingdom of the Netherlands", which refers to the entire realm including its Caribbean islands, is known in Afrikaans as Koninkryk van die Nederlande, a direct translation of the Dutch title Koninkrijk der Nederlanden, which uses the genitive article der meaning "of the".

Afrikaans may form compounds where Dutch would use separate words using the genitive or equivalent, or vice versa. For example, the Salvation Army is known in Afrikaans as Heilsleër, but in Dutch as Leger des Heils; conversely "Member of Parliament" in Afrikaans is Lid van Parlement, similar to English, while in Dutch, the term is parlementslid or kamerlid. However, in both languages, a member of a council or councillor is raadslid.

Possessive 

Whereas Dutch uses an apostrophe with an "s" as in English to form the genitive, or alternatively an "s" without an apostrophe, Afrikaans uses se, hence Maria's huis and haar broers probleem would be Maria se huis and haar broer se probleem respectively.

Afrikaans, like Dutch, has possessive pronouns to indicate ownership, hence joune and jouwe, although Afrikaans omits the use of the definite article, hence is dit jou glas of syne? ("is that your glass or his?") in contrast to is dat jouw glas of het zijne? in Dutch.

Similarly, van or "of" is also omitted in Afrikaans; compare dit is my fiets, waar is joune? ("that is my bike, where is yours?") to Dutch dat is mijn fiets, waar is die van jou? However, Dutch also uses the construction waar is de jouwe?

Plural 

While Afrikaans uses -e as the plural of most nouns, similar to Dutch -en, it also uses the -s  ending where Dutch would use -en, hence the plural of seun ("son") being seuns, in contrast to Dutch, in which the plural of zoon is zonen, zoons being used as a plural in eighteenth century Dutch. The plural zoons in Dutch is still common.

Similarly, -ers is used as a double plural instead of -eren, hence the plural of kind ("child") is kinders, not kinderen, although the plural kinders being used in nineteenth century forms of Dutch, including West Flemish.

Double negative 
A notable feature of Afrikaans is its use of a double negative, which is absent in standard Dutch, but still exists in some dialects like West Flemish, hence ik een niets nie gezien ("I have nothing not seen"). For example, ik spreek geen Engels ("I speak no English") in Dutch becomes ek praat nie Engels nie in Afrikaans. Similar constructions can be found in French (Je ne parle pas anglais) but also in old Dutch dialects, hence ik en kan niet gaan ("I not can not go") or daer is niemand niet ("there is nobody not").

Adjective inflections 
Like Dutch, adjectives in Afrikaans are generally inflected (with a number of exceptions) in the attributive position (when preceding the noun) and not in the predicative. Unlike Dutch, this inflection depends only on position, not grammatical gender; for example, nasionaal, when followed by party becomes nasionale, hence Nasionale Party.

This also applies to adjectives from which the final "t" has been dropped, for example, while "first" is eers, not eerst, "first time" is eerste keer in both languages; similarly, while "bad" is sleg in Afrikaans (instead of Dutch slecht), the "t" is reintroduced in inflected form, hence slegte tye ("bad times") similar to slechte tijden.

Similarly, just as Dutch adjectives ending with -ief, such as positief, are inflected to end with -ieve, for example, positieve reactie ("positive reaction") their equivalents in Afrikaans end in -iewe, hence positiewe reaksie, despite the differences in spelling.

Vocabulary differences 
Owing to the geographical and later political isolation of South Africa from the Netherlands, Afrikaans vocabulary diverged from that of Dutch, coining  purisms or using loan translations rather than adopting terms found in English, as English was perceived as being a greater threat to Afrikaans in South Africa than it was to Dutch in the Netherlands.

French and Latin influence 
While Dutch, like English, increasingly borrowed vocabulary from Latin or French, Afrikaans resisted such borrowing and instead favoured older Germanic equivalents, albeit with some exceptions; one of these is the Afrikaans word for "hospital", hospitaal, which, while understood in Dutch, is less widely used than ziekenhuis (literally "sick house").

For example, the word for "magistrate" in Afrikaans, landdros, comes from the Dutch term landdrost, a legacy of the old court system of the Dutch Cape Colony which survived its abolition and replacement by magistrate's courts under British rule, but the term is no longer officially used in the Netherlands, where the Latin-derived term magistraat is used instead.

Conversely, the Dutch word procureur, referring to a kind of lawyer, became obsolete in 2008, whereas in Afrikaans, prokureur is still used to mean "attorney", "solicitor" or "lawyer", especially in the sense of Prokureur-Generaal or "Attorney-General". The spelling prokureur was also previously used in Dutch. By contrast, whereas advocaat in Dutch means "lawyer", in Afrikaans, advokaat is only used to mean "advocate" or "barrister", hence "Senior Counsel" in Afrikaans being Senior Advokaat.

Similarly, the South African Navy is known in Afrikaans as the Suid-Afrikaanse Vloot, the word vloot (meaning "fleet") having been used in Dutch for the navy of the Dutch Republic, known as Staatse vloot, but the modern Dutch navy is known as the  Koninklijke Marine, marine being a French loanword.

In Afrikaans, Eerste-Minister ("first minister") was the official title of the Prime Minister of South Africa (before the post was abolished in 1984) and is still the official Dutch title of the Prime Minister of Belgium, but in the Netherlands, the term premier is used as a generic term for a prime minister or equivalent office holder, the official title of the Prime Minister of the Netherlands being minister-president.

In South Africa, the term premier is now more typically used in Afrikaans to refer to the head of government in each of the nine provinces, whereas eerste-minister is used for foreign leaders, and is used by the Afrikaans-language media in Namibia to refer to the country's Prime Minister.

Some French loanwords are common to Afrikaans as well as Dutch, such as regisseur, used in both languages to mean director of a play or film, although the use of rolprent in Afrikaans instead of "film" is considered old-fashioned in Dutch. The word redakteur ("editor") is used in Afrikaans as well as Dutch, but in the latter it is now written as redacteur.

Purisms and loan translations 

As the influence of English was perceived as a threat to Afrikaans, there was a trend to coin purisms rather than to borrow from English or international vocabulary; whereas the word for "computer" in Dutch is simply computer, in Afrikaans it is rekenaar, from reken, meaning "to calculate".

Other purisms were less successful; beeldradio, a word for "television" which literally means "picture radio", proposed before its introduction in the 1970s, was abandoned in favour of televisie, already used in Dutch. In South Africa and Namibia, the TV licence is known in Afrikaans as TV-lisensie, whereas in the Netherlands and Flanders, the now defunct equivalent was known in Dutch as kijkgeld ("viewing money") or omroepbijdrage ("broadcasting subsidy").

There are some instances of Afrikaans using calques or loan translations where Dutch uses an English loanword, such as the word for "milkshake", melkskommel, from melk ("milk") and skommel ("shake" or "shuffle") in contrast to Dutch, in which the original English word is untranslated.

Similarly, English has influenced such terms in Afrikaans as bestuurslisensie, from bestuur ("driving") and lisensie ("licence") and grondboontjiebotter, literally "peanut butter". By contrast, the Dutch term rijbewijs, translates as "driving certificate", but while ry is used in Afrikaans to mean "driving", bewys means "evidence" or "proof".

The Dutch term for peanut butter, pindakaas (literally "peanut cheese"), was coined because when it was first sold in the Netherlands, the term boter was a protected name and could only be used for products containing actual butter. The word pinda, a loanword from Papiamentu, spoken in the Dutch Caribbean, is ultimately of Kongo origin.

Comparison of vocabulary

Names of languages and countries
Unlike in Dutch, in Afrikaans, the word Afrikaans is not used to mean "African" in general; instead the prefix Afrika- is used, hence whereas African languages would be referred to in Dutch as Afrikaanse talen, in Afrikaans, they would be called Afrikatale. Conversely, the Afrikaans language is sometimes referred to in Dutch as Zuid-Afrikaans, literally "South African".
 
Although the Netherlands is formally called Nederland in Afrikaans, it is more colloquially known as Holland, as in English. The term Hollanders is similarly also used to refer to Dutch people in general, particularly in a historical context, while Hollands is used either to refer to the Dutch language or as an adjective, hence the expression die Kaap is weer Hollands ("the Cape is Dutch again") to mean that things are back to normal.

In the Netherlands, the former Dutch Reformed Church was known in Dutch as the Nederlandse Hervormde Kerk, but in South Africa, the two Dutch Reformed Churches are known in Afrikaans as the Nederduitse Gereformeerde Kerk and Nederduitsch Hervormde Kerk respectively, as Nederduitsch (or Nederduits) originally referred not to Low German but to any West Germanic language except High German.

Changes in meanings of words
Although the Afrikaans word as, like als in Dutch, means "if", it is also used as a conjunction to mean "than" with which to make comparisons, instead of dan, used in Dutch, hence "more than" is meer as (similar to mehr als in German) rather than meer dan, although meer als is also encountered in Dutch.
 
In Dutch, als can also mean "as" or "like", but Afrikaans generally uses soos, similar to zoals ("such as") in Dutch, whereas Dutch would use either als or zoals, hence the Afrikaans troeteldiere soos katte en honde... ("pets, like cats and dogs,...") could be translated into Dutch either as huisdieren als katten en honden  or dieren zoals katten en honden....

While the Afrikaans verb heet can be used to mean "to be called", like the Dutch heten, it is less commonly used for that purpose, hence "what is your name?" and "my name is John" would be wat is jou naam? and my naam is Johan, rather than hoe heet jy? ("how are you called?") and ek heet Johan. By contrast, Dutch would use hoe heet je? and ik heet John.

In Afrikaans, heet is used to mean "to be said", for example, soos dit heet ("as it is claimed") or, as in Dutch, "to bid", as in ek heet jou welkom ("I bid you welcome" or "I welcome you"). As an adjective, like the Dutch heet, it means "hot", as in "high temperature", and can also mean "fiery temper". In Dutch, heet can also mean "hot" in the sense of "spicy" or "horny".

Like praten in Dutch, the verb praat in Afrikaans means "to talk", but can also mean "to speak", where Dutch uses spreken; compare sy praat vlot Engels ("she speaks English fluently") with zij spreekt vlot Engels. However, Afrikaans uses sprekend as an adjective meaning "speaking", as in Afrikaansprekend ("Afrikaans-speaking"). Spreek is used interchangeably with praat, but praat is more common.

Like "football" in American and Australian English, the term voetbal is not generally used in Afrikaans to mean soccer, which, unlike in Dutch, is called sokker. Instead, it is used in the context of other codes of football, such as American football, hence Amerikaanse voetbal. In Dutch, soccer is only used to refer to the game when played in the United States. Rugby, however, is the more popular sport amongst Afrikaners.

Changes due to spelling and pronunciation
The changes in spelling and pronunciation in Afrikaans means that two unrelated words become homophones and are written identically, unlike their Dutch equivalents; bly in Afrikaans, like blij in Dutch is used as an adjective to mean "happy", it is also a verb meaning "to remain", cognate with blijven in Dutch.

In Afrikaans, unlike Dutch, the word ná (meaning "after") is written with an acute accent, as na (derived from Dutch naar) means "to". Conversely, while the Dutch word for "one" is written as één, to distinguish it from the indefinite article een, in Afrikaans, een ("one") is written without any diacritics as the indefinite article in that language is ŉ.

Similarly, the Dutch word for "before", vóór, may be written with acute accents on both vowels to distinguish it from voor, meaning "for", although it is correct to write the word without them irrespective of meaning. By contrast, voor in Afrikaans only means "before", the word for "for" being vir, and so no diacritics are required.

In both languages, oor means "ear", but in Afrikaans oor (derived from Dutch over) can also mean "over" or "about", as in hy praat oor die weer ("he talks about the weather", or in Dutch hij spreekt over het weer).

Although kus in Afrikaans can mean "kiss", as in Dutch, the more usual term is soen, similar to Dutch zoen, as the homophone kus means "coast". In contrast to the Dutch equivalents kus and kust (plural kussen and kusten), it is only in their inflected plural forms kusse and kuste that the two Afrikaans words can be clearly distinguished.

False friends due to English influence
English language influence has also resulted in changes in the meanings of some Afrikaans words, such as eventueel, which now means "eventual" or "eventually", rather than "possibly", as in Dutch. Consequently, some Afrikaans dictionaries give both meanings, with the entry for eventueel listing uitendelik ("finally") as well as moontlik ("possible") as definitions. However, the latter is described as Nederlandisties or "Dutch-influenced".
 
By contrast, other Afrikaans words cognate with Dutch ones retain the same meaning, such as aktueel, which, like actueel in Dutch, means "up to date" or "concerned with current affairs", although aktualiteit can also mean "reality" in the sense of the English word "actuality". The Dutch word actualiteit, on the other hand, only means "topicality" or "current events". Dutch also previously spelled both actueel and actualiteit with a "k".

Colloquialisms
Another consequence of the two languages diverging has been the differences between colloquialisms, meaning that a word in Dutch which has no offensive connotations is used as an expletive or term of abuse in Afrikaans, and vice versa, although other changes in meanings have also arisen.

For example, the Afrikaans phrase die meisie gooi haar flikkers ("the girl throws her sparkle") was highlighted by the Dutch journalist, Derk-Jan Eppink, in an article in the daily NRC Handelsblad, as an example of differences in meaning. In Afrikaans, flikkers by iemand gooi means to flirt with someone, but in Dutch, flikker means a male homosexual, while flikker op! is akin to the British English expletive "bugger off!"

List of words with different meanings

Comparisons of various phrases in Afrikaans and Dutch 

* In some Dutch dialects it is also common to pronounce als as as.
** In Dutch, in some dialects d between two vowels tends to degenerate to i (pronounced -) or w (e.g. goedendag > goeiedag (good day), bloeden > bloeien (bleed), rode > rooie (red), poeder > poeier (powder), loden > looien (lead), lang geleden >  (long ago), wij deden > wij dejen (we did), onthouden > onthouwen (remember)), some of which forms are more common and more accepted than others (dialectical, spoken, informal or standard language).

Comparison of sample text 
Below is a comparison of the Afrikaans words of the first stanza of "Die Stem van Suid-Afrika" (formerly the national anthem of South Africa) with the Dutch translation.

See also 
Comparison of Danish, Norwegian and Swedish
Comparison of Indonesian and Standard Malay
Comparison of Portuguese and Spanish
Comparison of Ukrainian and other Slavic languages

References

External links 
 Online Afrikaans-Dutch dictionary (PDF)
 Video of Die Stem van Suid-Afrika with Afrikaans and Dutch subtitles on YouTube

Afrikaans
Dutch language
Comparison of Germanic languages and dialects